Clyde James Miller (April 25, 1887 – October 3, 1958) was an American politician in the state of Washington. He served in the Washington House of Representatives from 1949 until his death in 1958.

References

1958 deaths
1887 births
Democratic Party members of the Washington House of Representatives
20th-century American politicians